Adult Contemporary is a chart published by Billboard ranking the top-performing songs in the United States in the adult contemporary music (AC) market.  In 2005, six different songs topped the chart in 53 issues of the magazine, based on weekly airplay data from radio stations compiled by Nielsen Broadcast Data Systems.

In the first issue of Billboard of the new year, the number one song was "Believe" by Josh Groban, which was in its fourth week atop the chart.  It remained at number one for two weeks in 2005 before being displaced by "Heaven" by Los Lonely Boys.  The Chicano rock trio's song had spent ten weeks in the top spot in 2004 and added a further eight weeks to its total in 2005 to finish with a total of 18 weeks at number one.  Despite this level of success, it was the group's only AC number one; although the band continued to record, releasing its most recent album in 2014, its final AC chart entry came in 2006.  "Heaven" was displaced from the top spot by "Breakaway" by Kelly Clarkson, which went on to spend 20 consecutive weeks at number one.  Clarkson won the first season of TV's American Idol in 2002 and quickly achieved a number of major pop hits.  Her 2004 album Breakaway, however, moved in a more rock-oriented direction, and the title track gave the singer her first AC number one.  She would go on to achieve considerable success on the Adult Contemporary chart in subsequent years, including two further number ones.

Another lengthy run at number one began in the issue of Billboard dated August 20, when "Lonely No More" by Rob Thomas reached the top spot.  Taken from the first solo album by Thomas, the lead singer of the band Matchbox Twenty, the song went on to spend 17 consecutive weeks atop the chart.  Unusually for an AC chart-topper, the song also reached number one on Billboards Hot Dance Club Play chart thanks to remixes from producers such as Jason Nevins and the Scumfrog.  "Lonely No More" held the top position on the AC listing until the issue of Billboard dated December 17, when it was displaced by Kimberley Locke's recording of the 19th-century Christmas song "Up on the House Top".  The former American Idol semi-finalist remained at number one for the final three weeks of 2005.  Locke would achieve further Christmas-themed AC number ones in each of the subsequent two Decembers, part of a trend of festive songs topping the AC listing which began in the early 21st century, when stations of the relevant format began devoting their playlists exclusively to seasonal songs in December.

Chart history

See also
2005 in music
List of artists who reached number one on the U.S. Adult Contemporary chart

References

2005
United States Adult Contemporary
2005 in American music